Lucy Ovia (born 27 July 1967) is a former Papua New Guinean woman cricketer. She was also the part of the  Papua New Guinea in the 2008 Women's Cricket World Cup Qualifier.

References

External links 

1967 births
Living people
Papua New Guinean women cricketers